The South African Railways Class MF 2-6-6-2 of 1911 was a steam locomotive from the pre-Union era in Transvaal.

In 1911, the Central South African Railways placed nine Mallet articulated compound steam locomotives with a  wheel arrangement in service. In 1912, when they were assimilated into the South African Railways, they were renumbered and designated Class MF. Five more of these locomotives were delivered in November 1911 and were numbered directly onto the South African Railways roster.

Manufacturer

Nine Mallet articulated compound steam locomotives which were delivered to the Central South African Railways (CSAR) in 1911 were built by the American Locomotive Company (ALCO) in 1910 and 1911. They were erected at the Durban workshops in March 1911 and were very similar to the experimental Class MD which had been delivered in 1910, except that the new locomotives were equipped with Schmidt superheaters. They were numbered in the range from 1015 to 1023.

Compound expansion
In a compound locomotive, steam is expanded in phases. After being expanded in a high-pressure cylinder and having then lost pressure and given up part of its heat, it is exhausted into a larger-volume low-pressure cylinder for secondary expansion, after which it is exhausted through the smokebox. By comparison, in the more usual arrangement of simple expansion (simplex), steam is expanded just once in any one cylinder before being exhausted through the smokebox.

In the compound Mallet locomotive, the rear set of coupled wheels are driven by the smaller high-pressure cylinders which are fed steam from the steam dome via the superheater. Their spent steam is then fed to the larger low-pressure cylinders which drive the front set of coupled wheels.

Characteristics
The most noticeable external difference from the experimental Class MD engine was the altered arrangement of the main steam pipes necessitated by the superheater. Instead of being led vertically down from the dome directly to the high-pressure cylinders, an internal pipe was taken from the regulator valve in the dome to the superheater in the smokebox, from where it was brought back to the high-pressure cylinders by external steam pipes arranged under the running boards.

South African Railways
When the Union of South Africa was established on 31 May 1910, the three Colonial government railways (Cape Government Railways, Natal Government Railways and CSAR) were united under a single administration to control and administer the railways, ports and harbours of the Union. Although the South African Railways and Harbours came into existence in 1910, with Sir William Hoy appointed as its first General Manager, the actual classification and renumbering of all the rolling stock of the three constituent railways were only implemented with effect from 1 January 1912.

In 1912, these locomotives were renumbered in the range from 1619 to 1627 and designated Class MF on the South African Railways (SAR). Five more of the type had been delivered from ALCO in November 1911, but these were numbered directly onto the SAR roster in the range from 1629 to 1633, marking the introduction of the SAR renumbering scheme under the Union programme.

The new locomotives were erected in the workshops in Pretoria rather than Durban. The erection of engines away from ports was an innovation which was probably the outcome of experience gained with the Class MD, which had been erected at Durban. While the locomotive was brought to the Transvaal, difficulty was experienced at Drummond and Laing's Nek where the drain angles on the cab roof struck the sides of the tunnels.

Service
The Class MF joined the experimental Class MD on the coal traffic line between Witbank and Germiston. They were acquired to improve the traffic flow on this line with its ruling gradient of one in one hundred (1%), where the increase of traffic and the resultant congestion was causing considerable delays en route which led to excessive hours of duty being imposed on crews.

The Mallets proved to be capable of handling the heavy coal loads. The  journey was accomplished in seven hours, which included several stops.

Modification to simplex
In 1923, engine no. 1620 was converted to a simple expansion locomotive in the Salvokop shops in Pretoria by replacing the two slide-valved low-pressure cylinders with piston-valved high-pressure cylinders. Five more, numbers 1621 to 1623, 1631 and 1632, were also converted to simple expansion locomotives in 1925. Three of these, numbers 1620, 1631 and 1632, were then transferred to East London where more powerful locomotives were needed since the mainline had a heavy gradient of one in forty (2½%) which started right at the end of the East London departing platform, making it an extremely difficult section. They appear to have not been up to the task in the Eastern Cape, however, since by 1926 they were observed there staged out of service.

They were all withdrawn from service and scrapped by 1939.

Illustration

References

2260
2-6-6-2 locomotives
(1C)C1 locomotives
ALCO locomotives
Cape gauge railway locomotives
Railway locomotives introduced in 1911
1911 in South Africa
Scrapped locomotives